is a Japanese light novel series by Yuu Kamiya. It is published under the MF Bunko J imprint with ten novels released between April 25, 2012, and January 25, 2018. The author and his wife, Mashiro Hiiragi, adapted the novels into a manga series for Monthly Comic Alive in 2013. Later that year, an anime adaptation of No Game No Life by Madhouse was announced. It premiered on AT-X between April and July 2014, and was simulcast outside Japan by Crunchyroll. An anime film adaptation of the sixth volume, No Game, No Life Zero, premiered on July 15, 2017. A spinoff manga, No Game No Life, Please!, focusing on the character Izuna, ran from May 27, 2015, to November 27, 2017. The No Game No Life franchise was localized in North America by several companies: Seven Seas Entertainment licensed the manga, Sentai Filmworks the anime, and Yen Press the light novel series.

The series follows Sora and his younger stepsister Shiro, two hikikomori who make up the identity of Blank, an undefeated group of gamers. One day, they are challenged by the god of games to chess and are victorious. As a result, the god summons them to Disboard, a world where stealing, war, and killing are forbidden, and all matters are decided through games, including national borders and even people's lives. Intent on maintaining their reputation as the undefeated gamers, Sora and Shiro plan to conquer the sixteen ruling species and to usurp the god of games.

The series began receiving recognition in 2014, when it appeared in Kono Light Novel ga Sugoi! and had its volumes placed as one of the top thirty selling novels in Japan. It was reported in May 2017 that over 3 million printed copies are in circulation. The English localization of the manga and anime were also well received: the manga adaptation appeared on The New York Times Manga Best Sellers; meanwhile, English reviewers were generally turned away by the first episode of the anime, though reviewers who have completed the series generally praised the character dynamics, game strategies, and animation, while disliking the fan service featuring the underage Shiro.

Plot
Sora and Shiro are two hikikomori stepsiblings who are known in the online gaming world as Blank, an undefeated group of gamers. One day, they are challenged to a game of chess by Tet, a god from another reality. The two are victorious and are offered to live in a world that centers around games. They accept, believing it to be a joke, and are summoned to a reality known as  There, a spell known as the Ten Pledges prevents the citizens of Disboard from inflicting harm on one another, forcing them to resolve their differences by gambling with games whose rules and rewards are magically enforced. In-game, rule enforcement only occurs when the method of cheating is acknowledged and outed by the opponent, allowing players to cheat through discreet methods. Sora and Shiro traverse to  the nation inhabited by humans, and befriend the duchess Stephanie Dola. Learning about Elkia's decline, the two participate in a tournament to determine the next ruler; after winning the crown, they earn the right to challenge the Disboard's other species as humanity's representative. Their next goal is to conquer all sixteen species in order to challenge Tet to a game; as of the sixth volume, five of the sixteen are under their control.

Characters

Main characters

 and 

Sora and Shiro are the main protagonists of the series and are stepsiblings. While Sora is an eighteen-year-old boy who excels at strategies and cold readings, Shiro is an eleven-year-old girl who excels at calculations and logic. The two form the undefeated gaming identity  due to their trademark of using only spaces as their in-game names. After their parents died, the two no longer had emotional ties to society and eventually became agoraphobic hikikomori. When the two are separated from each other, they begin to suffer panic attacks. After Sora and Shiro are summoned to Disboard, they decide to uphold their undefeated reputation as Blank by defeating Tet. A 2014 poll by Charapedia ranked Shiro and Sora as two of the most intelligent anime characters of all time.

Supporting characters

Stephanie is a teenage girl and granddaughter to the previous king of Elkia, the nation inhabited by humans. She has a lot of explicit knowledge. Unlike Sora and Shiro, she lacks the intuition to win games. Her grandfather was infamous for recklessly losing games and giving up almost all of Elkia's land for seemingly nothing in return. Consequently, Stephanie strives to restore the honor of her grandfather and humanity. When Sora and Shiro are crowned king and queen of Elkia, she becomes their assistant and handles Elkia's economics and politics behind the scenes. They later discover that her grandfather kept hidden records on the other species' games. These records become critical to their victories. Eventually, her experience with Sora and Shiro improves her skill to the point that she can win games against almost all normal humans.

Jibril is a  a powerful angelic race known for their ruthlessness. Jibril is over 6,000 years old and is the youngest and most powerful of her species. She won Elkia's library from Stephanie's grandfather and uses it to store her books and as a home. After losing to Sora and Shiro in a game of materialization word chain, she becomes their slave, but is treated as an equal. She often provides magic or transportation for the protagonists. Later on, she begins publishing novels based on Sora and Shiro, which makes them famous among the Flügel.

 and 

Kurami is an eighteen-year-old girl and considered the slave of the Elf Fil. Though Kurami's family were the Nilvalen family's slaves for generations, her relationship with Fil is similar to daughter and mother. Meanwhile, Fil is considered a failure of a magician but is secretly highly skilled. She is willing to betray  the nation inhabited by Elves, for Kurami's sake; the two conspire to have Fil obtain a political position of power in order to abolish slavery. Sora manages to convince Kurami to be his ally by sharing his memories with her.

Warbeasts

The Priestess is the nameless representative of the Warbeasts and ruler over the Eastern Federation. She is a logical woman who helped the Eastern Federation flourish for the past fifty years. She possesses a rare ability called Blood Destruction, which augments her physical abilities by taxing her body. She allies herself with Sora and Shiro, who promise benefits for humanity and Warbeasts. 

Izuna is an eight-year-old child who is the ambassador of the Kingdom of Elkia. She has a childlike demeanor and mistakenly assumes the copula desu itself makes a sentence polite, and says it at the end of every sentence regardless of the sentence's actual politeness. She also possesses high intellect and is capable of using Blood Destruction. Following the alliance between humans and Warbeasts, she is a constant companion to Sora and Shiro, whom she adores and trusts. 

 
Ino is Izuna's grandfather. He believes Sora has selfish ulterior motives and dislikes him. After the alliance between humans and Warbeasts, he works alongside Stephanie to formalize the union.

Dhampirs and Sirens
 are a species with similar characteristics to vampires: they drink body fluids from other species for nourishment; excel at transformation, illusion, and dream magic; and are weak to sunlight. Their weakness to sunlight can be spread through bites which deters the other species from sharing blood with them. Meanwhile,  are an all female species with the body of a mermaid. They require the life of a male from another species in order to reproduce; their magic allows them to seduce anyone of their choosing. Both species live in a nation called  Centuries ago, the Dhampirs and Sirens used the Ten Pledges to create a mutual relationship between the two; the dhampirs were allowed to feed on the sirens and in return, a male Dhampir is to mate with the empress of the Sirens who can reproduce without killing. Eight hundred years prior, the empress went into hibernation and the mating rituals killed all but a single male Dhampir.

Plum is the last living male Dhampir, and he disguises himself as a female as a result; his magic skills are considered above average within his species. After consuming Sora and Shiro's sweat, he becomes fond of their taste. He makes a deal with the Sirens to lure Sora and Shiro in an attempt to have one of the two races enslave humanity. Sora and Shiro deduce his deception but decide to save both races regardless. Since then, Sora and Shiro have Plum accompany them on their adventures.

 and 
Laila is the empress of the Sirens who used the Ten Pledges to put herself to sleep without revealing the requirements to wake her up. While Laila sleeps, Amira takes her place in leading the Sirens. Realizing that Laila is a masochist who desires a la douleur exquise, Sora's immunity to the Sirens' seduction magic allows him to awaken her. Subsequently, Laila used Sora's hair to create a Siren daughter.

Other characters

Tet is an  a magical entity born from wishes and prayers. During the era when the sixteen species were at war with each other, a human named  and his  wife,  imagined the existence of a god of games; this resulted in Tet's birth. Using its power, Tet cast the Ten Pledges on the world, ending the war and making the world centered around games.

Azriel is the first Flügel and their leader following the death of  the Old Deus who created them. Since then, Azriel has become despondent towards life and tries to give meaning to the Flügel's existence to prevent their suicide. She is able to converse with the Flügel's homeland, a sentient floating island called  which is part of a species called the  Following her loss against Sora and Shiro, her powers are reduced to the levels of a human which gives her a new perspective on life.

Publication and conception
No Game No Life is a light novel series written and illustrated by Yuu Kamiya. It is published under the MF Bunko J imprint; ten volumes were published by Media Factory between April 25, 2012 and January 25, 2018. In August 2014, Yen Press announced No Game No Life will be one of its titles published under its newly launched imprint, Yen On, in 2015. Non-English localizations include Brazil, Taiwan and Russia. Distribution in China was banned due to the government viewing the series as a threat to communism, while the Australian Classification Board banned the selling or importing of volumes 1, 2, and 9 in Australia for containing content that is "likely to cause offence to a reasonable adult".

No Game No Life was conceived during the serialization of A Dark Rabbit Has Seven Lives. Kamiya's original idea was a fantasy setting with battles; since he disliked drawing battles, he replaced it with games. He had intended to turn the idea into a manga series, but an unspecified illness made him unfit to handle the workload. While hospitalized for treatment, the author imagined how his idea would work as a light novel, and settled for that medium instead. Kamiya began writing the first volume and was advised to break it into three parts due to its length. In the middle of writing the second volume, Kamiya moved to his home country, Brazil, for further treatment for his ailment; in order to meet the volume's deadline, his wife drew some of the illustrations in the novel.

After the third volume, a new editor was assigned to the series. Kamiya noted the third volume contained a lot of plot progression, and was going to balance it out in the fourth volume with more lighthearted and carefree events. Volumes four and five were written as a single volume; since volume four lacked a climactic ending, Kamiya had to restructure the story. This, along with communication problems with his new editor, and other problems in Kamiya's life caused a month delay in volume four's release. After completing volume five, Kamiya was asked to submit volume six's manuscript before 2014 for the anime adaptation, and to complete the volume before the anime's premiere.

Manga adaptation
After reviewing the drawings made by Yuu Kamiya's wife, Mashiro Hiiragi, in second light novel volume, his editor suggested the two collaborate on a manga adaptation of No Game No Life for Monthly Comic Alive. Due to Kamiya's work on the third light novel volume, the manga serialization was delayed by a volume; the volume it was supposed to premiere in contained an apology page illustrated by Hiiragi. The series premiered in the March 2013 volume of Monthly Comic Alive and since then, is published irregularly in the magazine. Media Factory collected the individual chapters for the tankōbon release. In March 2014, Seven Seas Entertainment announced its licensing of the manga series and released the first tankōbon volume in October 2014; the title is stylized as No Game, No Life. The series has also been localized in Brazil, Taiwan and Russia.

A side series, titled  by Yuizaki Kazuya, began serialization in the July 2015 issue of Monthly Comic Alive on May 27, 2015.  The final chapter was published on November 27, 2017. It focuses on Izuna Hatsuse and her daily life.  Yen Press announced their license to the manga on October 28, 2016.

No Game, No Life

No Game No Life, Please!

Anime adaptation
On July 27, 2013, Monthly Comic Alive announced the anime adaptation for No Game No Life was green lit. It is directed by Atsuko Ishizuka and animated by Madhouse. The series premiered on April 9, 2014 on AT-X; it was later broadcast on five other broadcast stations and several streaming networks. The final episode premiered on June 25, 2014. Media Factory released the series in six DVD and Blu‑ray volumes between June 25 and November 26, 2014. The opening theme for the series was "This Game" by Konomi Suzuki and the ending theme is "Oracion" by Shiro's voice actress, Ai Kayano.

Crunchyroll simulcast No Game No Life and made it accessible to several regions. In North America, Anime Network broadcast the series on their cable network and made it available on their website, while Sentai Filmworks released the series for home media in July 2015. In the United Kingdom, MVM Entertainment licensed the series for distribution and in Australasia, Hanabee Entertainment licensed the series for its video on demand website. In France, the series was also simulcasted on Anime Digital Network and is broadcast on Viacom International Media Networks' J-one channel. In China, the series is made available on PPTV.

Yoshitsugu Matsuoka and Ai Kayano, the voice actors for Sora and Shiro respectively, hosted an internet radio show on Hibiki Radio called No Radio No Life. It was broadcast weekly between April 8 and July 29, 2014 and switched to a biweekly schedule since then. Twenty-six segments are planned and three CDs were released between July 2014 and February 2015. A special cross over featuring No Radio No Life and the radio series from Bladedance of Elementalers and Lord Marksman and Vanadis was broadcast by Hibiki Radio on January 1, 2015 and released on DVD on May 13.

An anime movie adaptation of the sixth light novel was announced on July 17, 2016 at the MF Bunko J Summer School Festival 2016 event. The film, titled No Game No Life: Zero, premiered on July 15, 2017, with the staff and cast from the anime series returning. Based on the sixth volume of the light novel series, the story is set 6000 years before the events of the series, with most of the original cast portraying ancient characters related to their present counterparts. The theme song is "There is a Reason" by Konomi Suzuki. The song was included on the album "No Song No Life" on July 12, 2017. Sentai Filmworks released the film theatrically within the United States from October 5, 2017, and has licensed the film for home video distribution. Madman Entertainment premiered the film in Australia at the Madman Anime Festival in Melbourne on November 5, 2017.

Episode list

No Game No Life
{|class="wikitable"margin:auto; background:#FFF;"
|-
! style="background:#A9D0F5; width:1%;"  | 
! style="background:#A9D0F5;"            | English title  Original Japanese title
! style="background:#A9D0F5; width:18%;" | Director
! style="background:#A9D0F5; width:16%;" | Writer
! style="background:#A9D0F5; width:14%;" | Original air date<ref name="Odates">{{cite web| url=https://mediaarts-db.bunka.go.jp/an/anime_series/18469| title=No Game No Life" series information| publisher=Agency for Cultural Affairs| language=ja| access-date=July 11, 2015| archive-date=September 1, 2018| archive-url=https://web.archive.org/web/20180901145700/https://mediaarts-db.bunka.go.jp/an/anime_series/18469| url-status=dead}}</ref>
! style="background:#A9D0F5; width:1%;"  | Ref
|-

|}

No Game No Life Specials

Reception
It was reported in May 2017, that over 3 million copies of the light novel are in circulation. That same year, No Game No Life was the top ten selling light novel series with several of its books appearing in the top thirty selling volumes list. Starting in its 2014 pool, the yearly magazine Kono Light Novel ga Sugoi!, listed the light novel and the protagonists of No Game No Life beginning in its polls; in addition, the series ranked fourth in Sugoi Japan 2015 polls. Seven Seas Entertainment's localization of the manga was able to reach The New York Times Manga Best Sellers and ICv2's charts. The anime series saw similar success and its home media made appearances on Oricon's weekly selling charts. In April 2014, No Game No Life'' was one of the top recorded anime series on Sony's Torne; a poll by AT-X ranked the series as one of 2014's top anime series.

Anime News Network had four editors review the first episode of the anime: Carl Kiminger, Rebecca Silverman, Theoron Martin, and Hope Chapman. Opinions summarized: Kimlinger enjoyed the premise and the concepts of games as battles; Silverman and Martin disliked the characters; and Chapman expressed absolute disdain, writing "nothing has made me roll my eyes, gag, or feel more irrationally angry this season than this insulting self-insert pandering trash heap". Carl Kimlinger continued the series, and published a positive review for the anime. He wrote that the premise presented many flaws but were balanced out by other aspects: Sora and Shiro's "over-powered hero" archetype is balanced out by their flawed lifestyles, motives, and their "visible delight in crushing their enemies"; Stephanie Dola's mistreatment with gags and Sora and Shiro's growing respect towards her; and the harem aspect with Sora's apathy and interesting female characters. Regardless, Kimlinger praised the plot's "big games", calling them the reason to watch the series and described them as "steeped in trickery and strategy"; he added that despite knowing the protagonists would win, the fun is seeing how they do it. Kimlinger wrote the over-saturation art style will be an acquired taste for most viewers and praised how the animation really shines during the "big games", calling it an impressive display of fluidity and timing.

Kotaku's Richard Eisenbeis was also positive towards the series, praising the protagonists' dynamic, echoed Kimlinger's sentiments about the games, liked the animation, but noted his dislike for fan service featuring Shiro. He also ranked the series as one of the top five anime series of 2014, and recommended it for viewers who like smart characters and gamer humor. Similarly, TAY Kotaku also praised the dynamics, references to other anime and video games, and the art style; the reviewer had mixed feelings towards the harem aspect and sexual humor, and agreed with Kotaku's dislike for the fan service featuring Shiro. IGN echoed previous opinions, praising the character dynamics, and also questioned the amount of unnecessary fanservice.

Notes and references
 represents the Light Novel of the series in the format of X.Y, where X represents the volume and Y represents the chapter. Chapter A represents the afterword of the novel.

Japanese

References

External links
 Official anime website 
 

 
2012 Japanese novels
2013 manga
2014 Japanese television series endings
Anime and manga based on light novels
AT-X (TV network) original programming
Censorship in Australia
Isekai anime and manga
Isekai novels and light novels
Japanese novels adapted into films
Light novels
Madhouse (company)
Media Factory manga
Medialink
MF Bunko J
Kadokawa Dwango franchises
Science fiction anime and manga
Seinen manga
Sentai Filmworks
Seven Seas Entertainment titles
Sharp Point Press titles
Yen Press titles